Kaone Vanderwesthuizen (born 1 December 1994) is a Motswana footballer playing for Township Rollers in the Botswana Premier League.

International career
Vanderwesthuizen made his Botswana debut in a 2-0 loss to Eritrea in the 2018 FIFA World Cup qualifiers.

Honours

Club
 Township Rollers
Botswana Premier League:4
2015-16, 2016-17, 2017-18, 2018-19
Mascom Top 8 Cup:1
2017-18

References

Living people
1994 births
Botswana footballers
Botswana international footballers
Township Rollers F.C. players
Association football defenders